Es buah is an Indonesian iced fruit cocktail dessert. This cold and sweet beverage is made of diced fruits, such as honeydew, cantaloupe, pineapple, papaya, squash, jackfruit and kolang kaling (Arenga pinnata fruit), mixed with shaved ice or ice cubes, and sweetened with liquid sugar or syrup. The type of fruit used in this dessert may vary, some might add any available fruits such as mango, watermelon or longan — some imported fruits — such as lychee, kiwi, strawberry, pear, peach or grapes. Other ingredients might be added too, such as agar-agar jelly, grass jelly, seaweed or nata de coco.

Es buah is a popular drink among Indonesians, especially during Ramadhan as a popular choice for iftar — to break the fast among Indonesian Muslims. It is quite similar with es campur and es teler although with different contents.

See also 

 Es campur
 Es teler 
 Es doger
 Ais kacang

References

External links 
 Es buah recipe special 
 Es buah recipe 
 Es buah recipe 

Indonesian desserts
Ice-based desserts
Fruit dishes
Indonesian drinks